Heteracia is a genus of flowering plants in the family Asteraceae. There is only one known species,  Heteracia szovitsii, native to the Balkan Peninsula, Crimea, Caucasus, Iran, Central Asia, Afghanistan, Pakistan, and Xinjiang.

References

Monotypic Asteraceae genera
Flora of Southeastern Europe
Flora of temperate Asia
Cichorieae